Strong Turkey Party (GTP) is a political party in Turkey and headed by Tuna Beklevic. It was founded on October 9, 2006.

2006 establishments in Turkey
Political parties established in 2006
Political parties in Turkey